Auguste Georges Schmutz, called Jean Loysel, (23 October 1889 – 29 December 1962) was a 20th-century French composer and lyricist.

He is mostly known for the duet he formed in the 1920s and 1930s with Georges Matis as lyricist or composer.

After the war, he also collaborated (as a lyricist) with Rolf Marbot (1906–1974), Bert Reisfeld's alter ego.

He also worked with Henri Salvador.

Works 
(selection)
 L'Araignée au plafond, musical comedy (20 December 1928), libretto by Albert-Jean ; lyrics by Jean Loysel ; music by Jean Loysel and Georges Matis. Reprint 
 Popaul, three-act operetta.
 Chanson de l'orang-outang, 1929
 Caravane dans la nuit, music by Louis Gasté, recorded among others by Line Renaud, Armand Mestral, from Perle du Bengal, opérette "féérique et nautique", 1954

References

External links 
 Jean Loysel on data.bnf.fr

French operetta composers
French male singer-songwriters
1889 births
Musicians from Brest, France
1962 deaths
20th-century French male singers
20th-century French male writers